Venus crebrisulca is a species of marine clam, a marine bivalve mollusc in the family Veneridae, the venus clams.

Description
The length of the clam attains 47.6 mm.

Distribution
This species occurs in the Atlantic Ocean off Morocco, Western Sahara and Senegal.

References

 Huber, M. (2010). Compendium of bivalves. A full-color guide to 3,300 of the world's marine bivalves. A status on Bivalvia after 250 years of research. Hackenheim: ConchBooks. 901 pp., 1 CD-ROM. 
 Cosel, R. von; Gofas, S. (2019). Marine bivalves of tropical West Africa: from Rio de Oro to southern Angola. Publications Scientifiques du Muséum, Paris, IRD Éditions, Marseille (Faune et Flore tropicales, volume 48): 1–1104.

External links
 Lamarck (J.-B. M.) de. (1818). Histoire naturelle des animaux sans vertèbres. Tome 5. Paris: Deterville/Verdière, 612 pp
 Rang, (S.). (1834). Venus. Venus. Linné. V. rosaline. V. rosalina, Rang. Magasin de Zoologie. 4: Classe V, Planche 42 

Veneridae
Molluscs described in 1758